Randall Roy Dipert (1951–2019) was an American philosopher and professor of philosophy at the State University of New York at Fredonia, the United States Military Academy, and the University at Buffalo where he retired as the C. S. Peirce Chair of American Philosophy.

Works 
Books

1985. (with William Rapaport and Morton Schagrin) Logic: A Computer Approach. McGraw-Hill. ,  
1993. Artifacts, Art Works, and Agency. Philadelphia: Temple University Press. ,

References

1951 births
2019 deaths
State University of New York at Fredonia faculty
United States Military Academy faculty
University at Buffalo faculty
University of Michigan alumni
Indiana University alumni
Philosophers of logic
20th-century American philosophers
21st-century American philosophers